Kirk Edward Springs (born August 16, 1958) is a former professional American football player who played safety for five seasons for the New York Jets in the National Football League.

Springs' most memorable NFL play came in a Monday Night Football contest at New Orleans on November 21, 1983, when he returned a Russell Erxleben punt 76 yards for a touchdown with less than four minutes remaining to lift the Jets to a 31-28 victory over the New Orleans Saints. The Jets scored 17 unanswered points in the fourth quarter to deny the Saints their first MNF victory. The loss eventually cost the Saints their first winning season and playoff berth, as New Orleans finished 8-8 under Bum Phillips.

External links
 New York Jets bio from 1985 yearbook

1958 births
Living people
Players of American football from Cincinnati
American football safeties
Miami RedHawks football players
New York Jets players